The Chile national ice hockey team is the national men's ice hockey team of Chile and is controlled by the Chilean Ice and Inline Hockey Federation. Chile is currently not ranked in the IIHF World Rankings and has not entered in any IIHF World Championship events.

History
The Chilean Ice and Inline Hockey Federation, known in Spanish as the Federación Chilena de Hockey en Línea y en Hielo (FCHLH), was founded and joined the IIHF in 2000. It was the third South American nation to join the IIHF after Brazil and Argentina. Chile is currently an IIHF affiliate member, and therefore not recognized for ice hockey, just inline hockey. There are three ice rinks in Santiago, Puerto Montt and Punta Arenas.

Chile made its debut in international ice hockey competition at the 2017 Pan American Tournament, which was held in Mexico City, Mexico between 5 and 11 June 2017. The first game on 5 June 2017 was a defeat to Argentina "A" 26–0. The second game came against the would-be champions of the tournament, Mexico "A", losing 17–0. The third game created a number of milestones for the Chilean team. The first goal in country history, and eventual game-winner was scored by the Chilean captain, Carlos Valdebenito Jr., who scored 3 goals and adding 2 assists totaling 5 points, also making it the current most points in the game record in the 6–0 victory over Brazil "B". However, the team's win over a club or "B" team was unofficial, and therefore does not count towards Chile's official international record. Chilean goalkeeper, Leonidas Aceitón, recorded his first shutout. Unfortunately, they suffered several injuries in the first three games of the tournament and having traveled with only eight skaters and one goalie, Chile was given permission by the tournament organizers to use players from other countries. Players from Mexico and Brazil joined the squad in the fourth game onwards. The fourth game was a hard-fought 4–3 victory over Argentina "B". The fifth game turned in a 6–0 loss to Colombia (Red). The sixth and final game was played on 11 June, a 9–0 defeat to Brazil "A". In the end, they finished 7th place with a record of 2–4.

On 6 September 2019, Chile played at the Amerigol LATAM Cup, sanctioned by the AmeriGol International Hockey Association, in Coral Springs, Florida, United States. This marks the second tournament appearance (first Amerigol LATAM Cup appearance) for the Chilean squad. Both times skating in Division I. Tournament record stands 0–3. They were defeated by Venezuela 8–4. Two games were played on 7 September. First, a 12–2 loss to the Mexico Selects team, followed by an 11–2 quarter-final loss to Colombia.

Tournament record

Pan American Tournament

Amerigol LATAM Cup

Roster
Roster for the 2022 Amerigol LATAM Cup.

Legend: +A, Alternate Captain; +C, Captain

See also
 Chile national inline hockey team

References

External links

IIHF profile
National Teams of Ice Hockey

National ice hockey teams in the Americas
Ice hockey